Donald Moffitt (July 20, 1931December 10, 2014) was an American author who wrote a number of science fiction novels. Most famous among these are The Genesis Quest and Second Genesis. While he was the author of many titles under his own name he also used the pseudonyms Paul Kenyon, Victor Sondheim, and Paul King. In the 1950s, Moffitt published approximately 100 short stories under 15 or more pen names (Wilson MacDonald, James D’Indy, and an assortment of others), in magazines like Man's Action, Wildcat, Gent, and Monsieur, while editing trade magazines by day.  Known for his science fiction, Moffitt later turned his attention to historical mysteries.

Bibliography (incomplete)

As Donald Moffitt

Short fiction
The Devil's Due (Fantastic Science Fiction Stories, May 1960; reprinted in Strange Fantasy, Fall 1969)
The Scroll (The Magazine of Fantasy and Science Fiction, May 1972)
The Man Who Was Beethoven (The Magazine of Fantasy and Science Fiction, December 1972)
Literacy (Analog Science Fiction and Fact, April 1994)
The Beethoven Project (Analog Science Fiction and Fact, April 2008)
Feat of Clay (Alfred Hitchcock's Mystery Magazine, September 2008)
The Affair of the Phlegmish Master (Analog Science Fiction and Fact, June 2009)
Deadly Passage (Alfred Hitchcock's Mystery Magazine, November 2009)
A Death in Samoa (Alfred Hitchcock's Mystery Magazine, October 2011)
A Snitch in Time  (Analog Science Fiction and Fact, January–February 2011)
The Color of Gold (Alfred Hitchcock's Mystery Magazine, March 2015)
A Handful of Clay (Alfred Hitchcock's Mystery Magazine, July–August 2015)

Novels
The Jupiter Theft (1977)
Jovian (2003)
Children of the Comet (2015, published posthumously)

Genesis Series
The Genesis Quest (1986)
Second Genesis (1986)

Mechanical Sky Series
Crescent in the Sky (1989)
A Gathering of Stars (1990)

As Paul Kenyon
Also, writing as "Paul Kenyon", a house pseudonym of Book Creations, Inc., he wrote The Baroness, an adult spy thriller series.
 The Baroness: The Ecstacy Connection (Pocket Books, 1974, #1)
 The Baroness: Diamonds are for Dying (Pocket Books, 1974, #2)
 The Baroness: Death is a Ruby Light (Pocket Books, 1974, #3)
 The Baroness: Hard-core Murder (Pocket Books, 1974, #4)
 The Baroness: Operation Doomsday (Pocket Books, 1974, #5)
 The Baroness: Sonic Slave (Pocket Books, 1974, #6)
 The Baroness: Flicker of Doom (Pocket Books, 1974, #7)
 The Baroness: Black Gold (Pocket Books, 1975, #8)
 (unpublished) The Baroness: A Black Hole to Die In
 (unpublished) The Baroness: Death is a Copycat

As Victor Sondheim
 Inheritors of the Storm (1981)
 (unpublished) Swimmers in the Tide

As Paul King

Dreamers Trilogy
 Dreamers (1992)
 The Voyagers (1993)
 The Discoverers (1994)

Notes

External links
http://www.donaldmoffitt.com

 Donald Moffitt Papers, MS 360 at the Kenneth Spencer Research Library, University of Kansas

 

1931 births
2014 deaths
Writers from Boston
20th-century American novelists
American male novelists
American science fiction writers
American male short story writers
20th-century American short story writers
20th-century American male writers
Novelists from Massachusetts